Marko Ivan Rupnik  (born 28 November 1954) is a Slovenian Jesuit priest, theologian and mosaic artist. Among the churches he has decorated around the world are the Saint John Paul II National Shrine in Washington D.C., the Redemptoris Mater Chapel in the Vatican's Apostolic Palace (Pope's personal chapel under John Paul II), the Sanctuary of Our Lady of Lourdes, the Sanctuary of Fátima, the Sanctuary of Saint Pio of Pietrelcina,  the Almudena Cathedral in Madrid. He is the director of Centro Aletti in Rome and he was a theological student of Tomáš Špidlík. In December 2022, Rupnik's brief excommunication due to the ecclesiastical crime of absolution of an accomplice and allegations about sexual misconduct became public knowledge.

Early life and education
Rupnik was born 28 November 1954 to Ivan and Ivanka Kaucic in Zadlog, a hamlet in the Municipality of Idrija, in western Slovenia, at the time part of Yugoslavia.  After finishing elementary school in Idrija, Rupnik continued his secondary education at the Minor Seminary in Vipava.

In 1973 Rupnik joined the Society of Jesus. After completing his novitiate, he studied philosophy at the Theological Seminary of Ljubljana, and then in 1977 enrolled at the Academy of Fine Arts in Rome, where he studied painting, graduating in 1981. He then enrolled in the theology program at the Pontifical Gregorian University in Rome.

In 1985 Rupnik was ordained a priest in Koper, but continued to study at the Gregorian, specializing now in missiology. From 1987 to 1991, he lived in Gorizia, in the Jesuit center Stella Matutina, where he worked while also writing his dissertation. In 1991 he received his doctorate in missiology from the Gregorian, with his thesis on "The Theological Missionary Meaning of Art in the Writings of Vjačeslav Ivanovič Ivanov".

Artistic and theological career
In 1991, Rupnik returned to Rome where he came under the mentorship of Tomáš Špidlík. In 1995 Rupnik was appointed director of the newly founded "Spiritual Arts" division of Centro Aletti  (Atelier d'Arte spirituale del Centro Aletti), a department of the Pontifical Oriental Institute.  Centro Aletti was set up primarily for central and eastern European scholars and artists to interact with their western counterparts, and became specialized in mosaic creation. The distinctive feature of these mosaics is their vast size; built to entirely cover the walls of cathedrals, they often reach an extension of hundreds or even thousands of square meters. As of 2009, artistic production has also expanded to the Middle East, Oceania, and South and North America.

Excommunication and allegations of abuse
The Society of Jesus issued a statement on 2 December 2022, confirming that Rupnik had undergone a canonical investigation in the previous months at the request of the Dicastery for the Doctrine of the Faith. In 2021 the Dicastery had received a complaint of alleged abuse against some nuns in 1995; no minors were involved in the allegations. The Society of Jesus then appointed a religious from another institute as external investigator, while Rupnik was placed under various restrictions, such as bans on hearing confessions, giving spiritual direction, conducting spiritual exercises, and engaging in public activities without a local superior's permission, as a precautionary measure. When the Dicastery received the result of the investigation, it dismissed the case: according to canon law, the statute of limitations expires after 20 years, whereas the charges referred to incidents almost 30 years earlier.

The Jesuit superior general Arturo Sosa then revealed on 14 December 2022 that, after a 2019 complaint, Rupnik had been convicted and sanctioned by the Holy See for the ecclesiastical crime of absolution of an accomplice. Rupnik had absolved a woman in confession of having engaged in sexual activity with him. Rupnik's excommunication was lifted after he repented for his crime. Despite the earlier statement on 2 December 2022, the restrictions on Rupnik's ministry "actually dated from that confession-related conviction, and not the 2021 allegations that the Vatican’s sex crimes office decided to shelve because they were deemed too old to prosecute."

After his conviction, Rupnik preached in 2020 a Lenten meditation for priests working in the Roman Curia, including Pope Francis and Cardinal Ladaria. Rupnik created the logo for the 2022 World Meeting of Families and he met privately with Pope Francis on 3 January 2022.

According to journalist Nicole Winfield, the "Rupnik's scandal has underscored the weaknesses in the Vatican’s abuse policies concerning spiritual and sexual abuse of adult women, and how powerful priests can often count on high-ranking support even after credible allegations against them are lodged."

Works

Mosaics
 Saint John Paul II National Shrine in Washington, D.C.

Books
English editions:
 In the Fire of the Burning Bush: An Initiation to the Spiritual Life by Marko Ivan Rupnik (2004) 
 Discernment: Acquiring the Heart of God by Marko Ivan Rupnik (2006) 
 Human Frailty, Divine Redemption: The Theology and Practice of the Examen by Marko Ivan Rupnik (2012) 
 Contemplating the face of Christ: a way of the cross by Marko Ivan Rupnik (2018) 
 According to the Spirit: Spiritual theology on the move with Pope Francis' Church by Marko Ivan Rupnik and Salesians of Don Bosco (2019)

Notes and references

External links

 Official website of Centro Aletti
 Complete list of the churches decorated, each one with the images of the artworks, at the website of Centro Aletti.
 Homilies and religious discourses at the YouTube channel of Centro Aletti.

1954 births
Living people
People from the Municipality of Idrija
Pontifical Gregorian University alumni
Christian theologians
20th-century theologians
Slovenian theologians
Mosaic artists
Catholic decorative artists
20th-century Slovenian artists
Jesuit theologians
Slovenian Jesuits
Sexual abuse scandal in the Society of Jesus
Sexual abuse of women in the Catholic Church